Mahima Silwal was a Nepalese actress. She appeared in numerous music videos, television commercials, print ads and half a dozen Nepali movies. She started off her career featuring in music videos. She made her acting debut in the movie Karbahi.

Filmography

Actress
list as of 2016.

References

External links
 Mahima's Photo gallery in Cybersansar

2020 deaths
21st-century Nepalese actresses
Nepalese female models
Nepalese film actresses
Year of birth missing
Road incident deaths in Nepal